Elizabeth Jennings may refer: 

 Elizabeth Jennings (poet) (1926–2001), English poet
 Elizabeth Jennings Graham (1827–1901), African-American teacher
 Jean Bartik (1924–2011), American ENIAC computer programmer who may also be known as Elizabeth Jean Jennings
 Elizabeth Jennings (The Americans) – fictional character from the TV show "The Americans"
 "Jennings, Elizabeth" – TV episode, an episode of "The Americans"

See also

 
 Jennings (disambiguation)
 Elizabeth (disambiguation)